Theta Aquarii (θ Aquarii, abbreviated Theta Aqr, θ Aqr), officially named Ancha  (distinguish Ankaa, with the same pronunciation), is a star in the equatorial constellation of Aquarius. Since it is near the ecliptic it can be occulted by the Moon, or very rarely by planets.

Nomenclature
θ Aquarii (Latinised to Theta Aquarii) is the star's Bayer designation.

It bore the traditional name Ancha; Medieval Latin for "the haunch". In 2016, the International Astronomical Union organized a Working Group on Star Names (WGSN) to catalogue and standardize proper names for stars. The WGSN approved the name Ancha for this star on 12 September 2016, and it is now so included in the List of IAU-approved Star Names.

Possibly, the name Lei, meaning "tears (weeping)" in Chinese, derives from the Chinese name for this star.

Properties
Ancha belongs to the spectral class G8 with a luminosity class of III–IV suggesting that, at an age of 437 million years, this star is part way between the subgiant and giant stages of its evolution. Estimates of the star's mass range from 2.39 to 2.78 times the Sun's mass, with a radius of about 12 times that of the Sun. It is radiating from 72 to 83 times as much luminosity as the Sun from its enlarged outer envelope at an effective temperature of 4,864 K. At this heat, the star glows with the yellow hue of a G-type star.

References

External links
 Image Ancha

211391
Aquarius (constellation)
Aquarii, Theta
G-type giants
G-type subgiants
Ancha
110003
Aquarii, 043
8499
BD-08 5845